Adamma is a contemporary maiden spirit mask that originates from the Enugu-Igbo of southeastern Nigeria. The mask is performed by men only and is accompanied by music that the masker dances to. Unlike other Igbo masks Adamma mask does not have any spiritual value behind it.

"Adanma" or what some spell as "Adamma" is also a girls name in Igboland Nigeria and it means, the first beautiful daughter of the family.

External links 
 Video of the Adamma dance on YouTube.

References 

Igbo society